Johnny Dusbaba (born 14 March 1956) is a Dutch retired footballer who played for Ajax and Anderlecht among others, as well as the Dutch national side.

Club career
He started his career at hometown club ADO Den Haag, before joining Hans Kraay-coached Dutch giants Ajax in 1974. A tough, but somewhat careless defender, he moved abroad to play in Belgium for Anderlecht alongside compatriots Peter Ressel, Arie Haan and Rob Rensenbrink and later for Standard Liège. After spending time at NAC, he finished his career at Sint-Niklaas.

International career
Dusbaba made his debut for the Netherlands in an August 1977 FIFA World Cup qualification match against Iceland and earned a total of 4 caps, scoring no goals. His final international was an October 1978 UEFA Euro qualification match against Switzerland. He was a preliminary member for the 1978 FIFA World Cup, but was not part of the final squad.

Personal life
Dusbaba was known for doing all kinds of dubious business during his playing career, selling fur coats, video recorders and TV's from the trunk of his car.

Honours 

Ajax Amsterdam

 Eredivisie: 1976-77

 RSC Anderlecht

 Belgian First Division: 1980–81
 European Cup Winners' Cup: 1977–78 (winners)
 European Super Cup: 1978
 Jules Pappaert Cup: 1977
Tournoi de Paris: 1977
 Belgian Sports Merit Award: 1978

Standard Liège

 Belgian First Division: 1981–82
 Belgian Supercup:1981
 European Cup Winners' Cup: 1981-82 (runners-up)

References

External links

 Player profile at Weltfußball.de

1956 births
Living people
Footballers from The Hague
Association football defenders
Dutch footballers
Netherlands international footballers
ADO Den Haag players
AFC Ajax players
R.S.C. Anderlecht players
Standard Liège players
NAC Breda players
Eredivisie players
Eerste Divisie players
Belgian Pro League players
Challenger Pro League players
Dutch expatriate footballers
Expatriate footballers in Belgium
Dutch expatriate sportspeople in Belgium
K. Sint-Niklase S.K.E. players